Michael Levin Anderson (born March 23, 1966) is an American former professional basketball player for Drexel University, the NBA, Spain's professional Liga ACB, the Continental Basketball Association (CBA), the Greek Basket League and the Turkish Basketball Super League.

College career
Anderson was a high school star at George Washington Carver High School of Engineering & Science, in Philadelphia. At Drexel, he averaged over 19 points per game during his college basketball career, and led the Dragons to their first-ever NCAA Men's Division I Basketball Championship appearance in 1986, where they lost to eventual national champion, Louisville. This game was notable because Anderson was playing against familiar local foes, Milt Wagner and Billy Thompson, who played high school ball on Camden's nationally ranked team. That year Anderson was named to the UPI and Sporting News honorable mention All-America teams. Anderson also led the Dragons to an upset of a David Robinson-led Navy team in the Palestra in 1987, one of the biggest wins in school history.

Anderson is ranked 12th all-time in career NCAA steals, with 341, and he is tied for second all-time in career NCAA triple doubles. He was recognized in 2008 by the Colonial Athletic Association as a CAA Men's Basketball Legend, in a class that included University of Maryland and James Madison University head coach Charles "Lefty" Driesell.

Professional career
Anderson would become the first Drexel basketball player to make the roster of an NBA team. He played for the San Antonio Spurs during the 1989 NBA season, after being drafted by the Indiana Pacers in the 3rd round (23rd pick), of the 1988 NBA Draft.

Anderson had a successful four-year career in the Spanish ACB League, playing from 1993 to 1997. He played for Real Madrid, Baloncesto León, CB Murcia and Caja San Fernando, garnering league MVP honors in the 1995–96 season, while playing for the latter. He was also a 1993 ACB league All-Star. After that, he played for Ülkerspor in Turkey, and with them he won the 1997–98 Turkish Basketball Super League season championship, while averaging 21.1 points per game. Anderson also played a couple years in the USBL and the Continental Basketball Association (CBA), making the All-Rookie team in 1988–89, with the Charleston Gunners, and making first team All-League with the Tri-City Chinook in 1993–94.

NBA career statistics

Regular season 

|-
| style="text-align:left;"| 
| style="text-align:left;"| San Antonio 
| 36 || 12 || 20.3 || .417 || .143 || .695 || 2.5 || 4.3 || 1.2 || 0.1 || 5.7
|- class="sortbottom"
| style="text-align:center;" colspan="2"| Career
| 36 || 12 || 20.3 || .417 || .143 || .695 || 2.5 || 4.3 || 1.2 || 0.1 || 5.7

See also
 List of NCAA Division I men's basketball career free throw scoring leaders
 List of NCAA Division I men's basketball career steals leaders
 List of NCAA Division I basketball career triple-doubles leaders

References

External links
Basketball-Reference.com
Drexel Basketball Media Guide
ACB League website 
Drexel Writeup On Eddie Burke and Michael Anderson
Turkish Basketball Super League Profile

1966 births
Living people
American expatriate basketball people in Croatia
American expatriate basketball people in the Philippines
American expatriate basketball people in Spain
American expatriate basketball people in Turkey
American men's basketball players
Baloncesto León players
Basketball players from Philadelphia
CB Girona players
CB Murcia players
CB Zaragoza players
Charleston Gunners players
Drexel Dragons men's basketball players
Indiana Pacers draft picks
KK Cibona players
Liga ACB players
Peristeri B.C. players
Philippine Basketball Association imports
Point guards
Pop Cola Panthers players
Rapid City Thrillers players
Real Betis Baloncesto players
Real Madrid Baloncesto players
San Antonio Spurs players
Tri-City Chinook players
Ülker G.S.K. basketball players
United States Basketball League players